Aaliyah ( or ) is a female given name meaning "exalted one".

Notable people
Aaliyah Alleyne (born 1994), West Indian cricketer
Aaliyah Brown (born 1995), American sprinter
Aaliyah Edwards (born 2002), American basketball player
Aaliyah Fasavalu-Fa'amausili (born 2000), Australian rugby league footballer
Aaliyah Haughton or mononymously Aaliyah (1979–2001), American singer and actress
Aaliyah Nolan (born 1997), Bermudian footballer
Aaliyah Palestrini (born 2003), Seychellois swimmer
Aaliyah Powell (born 2002), British taekwondo practitioner
Aaliyah Prince (born 2001), Trinidadian footballer
Aaliyah Wilson (born 1998), American basketball player

See also
Aliyah (given name)

References